Sutton United Football Club, an association football club based in Sutton in the London Borough of Sutton, England, was founded in 1898 as a merger between Sutton Guild Rovers and Sutton Association Football Clubs. They were elected to play in the Athenian League for the 1921–22 season. They won the Athenian League title on three occasions and were runners-up once. After thirty-seven seasons in the Athenian League, they joined the Isthmian League (given the subtitle First Division in 1973 and then Premier Division in 1977). The club spent twenty-three seasons in the league, during that spell they won the title twice, reached the fourth round of the 1969–70 FA Cup, and reached the 1981 FA Trophy Final losing 1–0 to Bishop's Stortford. In 1986 they won the first promotion in their history as champions of the Isthmian League, moving up to the Football Conference.

United's third season in the Conference saw them reach the fourth round of the FA Cup for the second time in their history during the 1988–89 edition; their third round tie was a 2–1 victory over First Division side Coventry City, one of the biggest shocks in the competition. In 1991 United's spell in the conference was ended with relegation back to the Isthmian League Premier Division. The club finished the 1998–99 Isthmian League season as champions returning to the Conference after an eight-year absence. United's second spell in the Conference lasted a single season finishing the 1999–2000 Football Conference in last place. Up to 2004 the Conference was one division, but restructuring of the National League System saw two new divisions added, Conference North and Conference South, with many Isthmian League members transferred to these new divisions; for the 2004–05 season Sutton United were transferred to the South division.

After four seasons United experienced the third relegation of their history, rejoining the Isthmian Premier League. Their first season back saw them qualify for their first play-offs losing 3–0 in the semi-final to Staines Town. United reached the play-offs in the following season losing in the semi-finals again, this time 4–2 to Kingstonian. United's ended their third season as champions of the Isthmian Premier League and were promoted to the Conference South. Their five-season spell in the Conference South included two more failed play-off attempts. For the 2015–16 season the division was renamed National League South (with Conference Premier and Conference North also renamed) and United finished as champions with promotion to the National League. The 2016–17 season saw Sutton reach the fifth round of the FA Cup which is their furthest run in the competition and they became the ninth non-league team to reach this stage; they were drawn at home to Premier League side Arsenal and were defeated 2–0. The club finished the 2020–21 National League season as champions and were promoted into the English Football League for the first time in their history, they will compete in the 2021–22 EFL League Two.

Key

Key to divisions
 Athenian League
 Isthmian League
 Isthmian League First Division
 Isthmian Prem = Isthmian Premier Division
 Conference = Football Conference
 Conference South = Football Conference South
 National South = National League South
 National League
 EFL League Two

Key to positions and symbols
  = Champions
  = Runners-up
  = Promoted
  = Relegated

Key to rounds
EPR = Extra preliminary round
PRE = Preliminary round
QR1 = First qualifying round, etc.
R1 = First round, etc.
QF = Quarter-finals
SF = Semi-finals
RU = Runners-up

Seasons

Notes

References
General
 
 

Specific

 
Sutton United